Joseph Dufour (November 28, 1874 – November 2, 1956) was a Canadian provincial politician.

Born in Saint-Pascal, Quebec, Dufour was the member of the Legislative Assembly of Quebec for Matane and Matapédia. In 1922, he was made a Commander of the Order of St. Gregory the Great.

References

1874 births
1956 deaths
People from Bas-Saint-Laurent
Quebec Liberal Party MNAs